
This is a list of aircraft in numerical order of manufacturer followed by alphabetical order beginning with 'M'.

Me

Mead 
(Mead Engineering Co, Colwich, KS)
 Mead Adventure 100

Meade 
(C R Meade, Blackwell, OK)
 Meade Swallow

Meadowbrook 
(William Meadowbrook (possibly Meadowcroft))
 Meadowbrook MC-1 Chinook

Meadowlark Ultralight 
(Meadowlark Ultralight Corporation)
Meadowlark Ultralight Meadowlark

Means 
(Sidney S Means, San Antonio, TX)
 Means Taper wing

Meckler-Allen 
(Allen Canton and John J. Meckler)
 Meckler-Allen 1912 Biplane

Medway 
(Medway Microlights, Rochester, Kent, United Kingdom)
 Medway Av8R
 Medway EclipseR
 Medway SLA100 Executive
 Medway SLA100 Clipper

Medwecki
(Józef Medwecki and Zygmund Nowakowski)
 Medwecki M9
 Medwecki HL 2
 Medwecki and Nowakowski M.N.5

Meger 
(Mike Meger, Marinette, WI)
 Meger Heli-Star

Meggitt
 Meggitt Banshee

Mehr 
(Ing. Franz Xaver Mehr – Erla Maschinenwerk G.m.b.H.)
 Mehr Me 1 – ultralight 12 hp DKW TL500
 Mehr Me 2 – not built due to lack of funds
 Mehr Me 3 1931
 Mehr Me 4 glider
 Mehr Me 4a motor-glider
 Mehr Me 5
 Mehr Me 6

Meindl/van Nes 
(Ob.-Ing. Erich Meindl / Wilhelm van Nes)
 Meindl/van Nes A.VII Cadet (Meindl M7)
 Meindl/van Nes A.VIII (Meindl M8)
 Meindl/van Nes A.XV (Meindl M15)

Meindl
(Ob.-Ing. Erich Meindl / Burgfalke Flugzeugbau)

 Meindl M.15
 Meindl M.100
 Meindl M.101
 Meindl M.110
 Burgfalke M.150 Schulmeister
 Meindl M.211

Melberg-Greenemeier 
((Raymond) Melberg, (Conrad) Greenemeier & (Rowan) Ward, 2949 Columbia St, Denver CO) a.k.a. Melberg-Greenemeier-Ward
 Melberg-Greenemeier MG-1
 Melberg-Greenemeier MG-2 a.k.a. DGA Wilson or Humphreys MG-2
 Melberg-Greenemeier MG-3

Melbourne Aircraft Corporation 
 MAC Mamba

Melfe 
(Mike Melfa, Miami, FL)
 Melfa WCA-1

Melody Aircraft
(Melody Aircraft Ltd.)
 Melody Aircraft Song
 BELITE ULTRACUB
 BELITE PROCUB

Melton 
(Clarence C Melton, Kansas City, MO)
 Melton#1 (Katydid)
 Melton#3 (Sport)
 Melton Houpisine a.k.a. K C Special

Mendenhall 
(Eugene Mendenhall, Los Angeles, CA)
 Mendenhall M-1 a.k.a. Special

Menefee 
(Menefee Airways Inc, 2111 Burgundy St, New Orleans, LA)
 Menefee Crescent

Mentzel 
(Ing Büro Mentzel, Prinzhöfte, Germany)
Mentzel Baltic Fox
Mentzel Baltic Fox Sea

Merćep 
(Mihajlo Merćep)
 Merćep 1909 Biplane
 Merćep-Rusjan 1910 monoplane – Slovenia – M.Mercep, E. Rusjan and J. Rusjan
 Merćep 1911 Monoplane
 Merćep 1912 Monoplane

Merckle 
 Merckle SM 67

Mercury 
(1920: Aerial Service Corp (Pres: Henry Kleckler), Hammondsport, NY, 1922: Aerial Engr Corp, 1929: Mercury Aviation Co (Harvey Mummert, R W Schroeder & John R Wentworth). )
 Mercury Chic T-2
 Mercury CW-1 Junior
 Mercury S a.k.a. Red Racer
 Mercury S-1 a.k.a. White Racer
 Mercury Special
 Aerial Booth Bee Line
 Aerial Mercury Senior
 Aerial Standard
 Aerial Thurston Monoplane
 Aerial Kitten
 Aerial DW-4 Trainer
 Aerial Arrow

Mercury 
(Mercury Aircraft Corp (Pres: P E Crosby), Fairfax KS.)
 Mercury Mars

Mercury 
( Mercury Aircraft Corp (Pres: F L Bette, V Pres/chief engr: J B Baumann, V Pres/gen mgr: Dick Smith), Menominee, MI)
 Mercury B-100
 Mercury BT-120 Aerobat

Mercury Air 
 Mercury Air Shoestring

Meridionali 
(IMAM – Industrie Meccaniche e Aeronautiche Meridonali)
 IMAM Ro.1
 IMAM Ro.5
 IMAM Ro.10
 IMAM Ro.26
 IMAM Ro.30
 IMAM Ro.35
 IMAM Ro.37
 IMAM Ro.41
 IMAM Ro.43
 IMAM Ro.44
 IMAM Ro.45
 IMAM Ro.51
 IMAM Ro.57
 IMAM Ro.58
 IMAM Ro.63
 IMAM Ro.71
 IMAM AG
 Meridionali/Agusta EMA 124

Merkel 
( (Edwin W) Merkel Airplane Co, Wichita and Valley Center, KS)
 Merkel Mark II

Merckle
(Merckle Flugzeugbau)
 Merkle LF 501 Kiebitz

Merle 
(A J Merle, Alameda, CA, and Hans P Nielsen, Alameda, CA)
 Merle 1910 Biplane

Merlin 
 Merlin EZ
 Merlin GT

Merlin 
(Merlin Autogyros, Quedgeley, Gloucestershire, United Kingdom)
 Merlin GTS

Merrill 
((Albert A) Merrill Aircraft Co. / California Institute of Technology)
 Merrill CIT-9 Safety Plane

Merrill 
(Herbert J Merrill, San Diego, CA)
 Merrill 1931 Monoplane

Merville 
(Société des Hélices G. Merville)
 Merville D.63
 Merville SM.30
 Merville SM.31

Messer 
((Glenn) Messer Aeronautical Industries Inc. / Southern Aircraft Co.)
 Messer 1927 Biplane

Messerschmitt 
(Messerschmitt AG)
 Messerschmitt M 17
 Messerschmitt M 35
 Messerschmitt M 36
 Messerschmitt Bf 108 Taifun
 Messerschmitt Bf 109
 Messerschmitt Bf 110
 Messerschmitt Me 155
 Messerschmitt Bf 161
 Messerschmitt Bf 162 Jaguar
 Messerschmitt Me 163 Komet
 Messerschmitt Bf 164
 Messerschmitt Me 208
 Messerschmitt Me 209 racer
 Messerschmitt Me 209 fighter
 Messerschmitt Me 210
 Messerschmitt Me 261
 Messerschmitt Me 262 Schwalbe
 Messerschmitt Me 263
 Messerschmitt Me 264 Amerika
 Messerschmitt Me 265
 Messerschmitt Me 309
 Messerschmitt Me 310
 Messerschmitt Me 321 Gigant
 Messerschmitt Me 323 Gigant
 Messerschmitt Me 328
 Messerschmitt Me 329
 Messerschmitt Me 410 Hornisse
 Messerschmitt Me 509
 Messerschmitt Me 609
 Messerschmitt C-44

Messier 
( Avion George Messier – now Messier-Bugatti-Dowty)
 Messier CT.001

Messler 
(Raoul Messier, Andover, CT)
 Messler Snipe PT101 Serial 2

Metal Aircraft Corporation 
 Metal Aircraft Corporation Flamingo
 Metal Aircraft Corp G-1 Flamingo
 Metal Aircraft Corp G-2 Flamingo
 Metal Aircraft Corp G-2 Flamingo
 Metal Aircraft Corp G-2-W Flamingo
 Metal Aircraft Corp G-MT-6 Flamingo

Metal Master
 Metal Master LAR-1

Métalair
 Métalair 1

Metalclad 
 Metalclad Airship

Metcalf 
 Metcalf 1909 Helicopter

Meteor 
 Meteor FL.53
 Meteor FL.54
 Meteor FL.55
 Meteor bis
 Meteor Super

Meteoric 
(Meteoric Aeroplane Co)
 Meteoric 1911 Aeroplane

Methvin 
(Wilbur C Methvin, Lawrenceburg, TN & Kermit Parker, Atlanta, GA)
 Methvin XP-101

Meunier 
(Pierre Meunier)
 Meunier PM.301 Dauphin

Meyer 
(George W Meyer, Corpus Christi, TX)
 Meyer Little Toot

Meyer 
(Les K Meyer, Enumclaw, WA)
 K-Meyer Aero Model A

Meyer 
(Clair O Meyer, Bay Minette, AL)
 Meyer P-51B (2/3 scale)

Meyerhoffer 
(Otto Meyerhoffer, Oroville)
 Otto Meyerhoffer, Oroville, CA

Meyers 
(George F Meyes, Columbus, OH)
 Meyers 1906 Orthopter

Meyers 
(Charles W Meyers, Greensboro, NC)
 Meyers Midget

Meyers 
((Allen H) Meyers Aircraft Co, Romulus and Tecumseh, MI)
 Meyers OTW-125
 Meyers OTW-145
 Meyers OTW-160
 Meyers MAC-124
 Meyers MAC 125
 Meyers MAC-126
 Meyers MAC-145
 Meyers MAC-200
 Meyers Me-165W
 Meyers 200

References

Further reading

External links 

 List of Aircraft (M)

fr:Liste des aéronefs (I-M)